A list of films produced in Hong Kong in 1955:.

1955

References

External links
 IMDB list of Hong Kong films
 Hong Kong films of 1955 at HKcinemamagic.com

1955
Hong Kong
Films